Rousseau Peak is a peak rising to 272 m in the north of Breznik Heights, Greenwich Island in the South Shetland Islands, Antarctica and surmounting Sotos Point to the west-northwest and Fuerza Aérea Glacier to the north, west and south.  Precipitous, rocky west slopes.

The feature is named after Lieutenant Commander Óscar Rousseau, an Argentine Navy officer who joined the 1947 Chilean Antarctic Expedition as a guest of the Government of Chile.

Location

Maps
 L.L. Ivanov et al. Antarctica: Livingston Island and Greenwich Island, South Shetland Islands. Scale 1:100000 topographic map. Sofia: Antarctic Place-names Commission of Bulgaria, 2005.
 L.L. Ivanov. Antarctica: Livingston Island and Greenwich, Robert, Snow and Smith Islands. Scale 1:120000 topographic map.  Troyan: Manfred Wörner Foundation, 2009.

References
 Composite Antarctic Gazetteer.

Mountains of Greenwich Island